Rineyville is an unincorporated community and census-designated place (CDP) in Hardin County, Kentucky, United States. The Paducah and Louisville Railway runs north and south through the community.

There is no formal city government; a Magistrate, elected to the Hardin County Fiscal Court, represents the unincorporated community. The primary law enforcement agency for Rineyville is the Kentucky State Police – Post 4 in Elizabethtown. The Rineyville Fire Department, created in 1979, consists of over 30  volunteers from the community. Some neighboring communities include Vine Grove to the north, Radcliff to the northeast, and Cecilia to the south.

Rineyville is named for past resident Zachariah Riney, the first school teacher of young Abraham Lincoln.

Demographics

References

External links
Kentucky State Police – Post 4
Rineyville Volunteer Fire Department

Census-designated places in Hardin County, Kentucky
Census-designated places in Kentucky
Elizabethtown metropolitan area